Denis O'Gorman (28 August 1914 – 1 May 2005) was an Irish hurler who played as a left corner-back and as a goalkeeper for the Tipperary senior team.

O'Gorman made his first appearance for the team during the 1934 championship and was a regular player over the course of the next decade. During that time he won one All-Ireland winners' medal and two Munster winner's medals.

At club level, he enjoyed a lengthy career with Holycross–Ballycahill, however, a county club championship winners' medals eluded him.

O'Gorman also won four Railway Cup winners' medals with Munster.

References

Teams

1914 births
2005 deaths
Holycross-Ballycahill hurlers
Tipperary inter-county hurlers
Munster inter-provincial hurlers
Hurling goalkeepers
All-Ireland Senior Hurling Championship winners